The  (abbreviated as ) or Popular Rights Movement was a Japanese political and social movement for democracy in the 1880s. It pursued the formation of an elected legislature, revision of the Unequal Treaties with the United States and European countries, the institution of civil rights, and the reduction of centralized taxation.

The Movement prompted the Meiji government to establish a constitution in 1889 and a diet in 1890; on the other hand, it failed to loosen the control of the central government and its demand for true democracy remained unfulfilled, with ultimate power continuing to reside in the Meiji (Chōshū–Satsuma) oligarchy because, among other limitations, under the Meiji Constitution, the first election law enfranchised only men who paid a substantial amount in property taxes, as a result of the Land Tax Reform in 1873.

Related people
Chiba Takusaburō, author of the "Itsukaichi constitution" (五日市憲法), a draft constitution for the Empire of Japan
Etō Shinpei
Fukuda Hideko
Gotō Shōjirō
Ido Reizan
Inoue Kaoru
Itagaki Taisuke, founder of the first Jiyūtō, and former leader of the Jinshotai
Yamamoto Yae
Nakae Chōmin
Ōkuma Shigenobu
Shimizu Shikin
Soejima Taneomi
Yamaji Motoharu, former Jinshotai commander
Tokutomi Sohō
Ueki Emori
Soeda Azenbō, prolific enka lyricist and street performer
Saionji Kinmochi, one of the last Meiji period democrats, who later tried to prevent the Tripartite Pact

See also

 Liberalism in Japan
 Japanese dissidence during the Shōwa period
Taisho Democracy
 General Election Law - the law which granted all males aged 25 and over suffrage, enacted in 1925.

References

Political organizations based in Japan
Politics of the Empire of Japan
1880s in Japan
Democracy movements
Liberalism in Japan
Electoral reform in Japan